Daiga is a Latvian feminine given name. The associated name day is October 16.

Notable people named Daiga

References 

Latvian feminine given names
Feminine given names